Patricia "Pan" Godchaux is a moderate Republican who ran for the United States Congress for the 9th federal congressional district in the state of Michigan.  She challenged seven-term incumbent Joe Knollenberg in the Republican primary and hoped to get Democratic support, as the Democrats' challenger, Nancy Skinner, didn't have to face a primary contest. She notes that the district is inclined to vote Republican, and that unless citizens of the district want to re-elect a conservative Republican, their best chance to avoid doing so was by placing a moderate on the ballot in November.  Ultimately Gochaux failed in her attempt to unseat the seven-term incumbent, garnering 30% of the vote to Knollenberg's 70%, or 20,211 to 46,713 votes.

Godchaux previously served on the Birmingham, Michigan school board and the Michigan House of Representatives.  She is a member of Triangle Foundation's Board of Advisors.

References

Year of birth missing (living people)
Living people
People from Birmingham, Michigan
Republican Party members of the Michigan House of Representatives
Women state legislators in Michigan
21st-century American women